Drage is a municipality in the district of Harburg, in Lower Saxony, Germany. With Marschacht and Tespe it completes the Samtgemeinde Elbmarsch. Drage is close beside Winsen (Luhe), the center of the county Harburg.

References

Harburg (district)